Bug-eye glasses are a form of eyewear. They were popular in the 1970s, 1980s and 1990s, and were used for regular glasses and sunglasses. They first became popular in the mid-1970s, and succeeded the cat eye glasses of the 1950s and 1960s.

In the 1970s, they were more of a square shape, and then later evolved into the more characteristic, larger, rounder and more familiar bug-eyed style of the 1980s. Their popularity began to decline later, as glasses became easier to get and more affordable. They were fashionable for men and women; the sunglasses form remains fashionable today, while the traditional glasses are now associated mainly with the elderly. They were followed by the thick-rimmed, rectangular styled glasses of the 2000s. Notable wearers are: Audrey Hepburn, Jacqueline Kennedy Onassis, Paris Hilton, Nicole Richie, Sophia Loren and Victoria Beckham.

References

1970s fashion
1980s fashion
1990s fashion